Rapid City Fruit Company is a historic building at 320 7th Street in Rapid City, South Dakota. It was listed on the National Register of Historic Places in 1993.

History
Constructed in 1920 by C. A. Nesbit, the Rapid City Fruit Company building was used as a distribution center for produce passing through Rapid City. Nesbit, a rancher in nearby Fairburn, sold his ranch to focus on the fruit business. Both Nesbit and Gray had also previously been grocers. Located in the warehouse district near the railroad, the company's building was a major regional produce distribution hub. Even after the fruit company disbanded—the date of which is unknown due to lack of records, but is estimated to be 1935—the building itself was still used as a warehouse for several decades. From 1936 to 1960, it was a warehouse for a local tobacco company. Between 1962 and 1982, it served as a warehouse for the Barber Company and Black Hills Warehouse Inc.; for ten years after that, it housed wholesale businesses. Today, it is still used as a commercial building.

On December 9, 1993, the building was added to the National Register of Historic Places for its importance to the economic history of Rapid City, and for its well-preserved commercial architecture.

Architecture
The Rapid City Fruit Company building is a one-story rectangular building at the corner of 7th and Apolda Streets and faces south. It measures  and includes a basement that was used as cold storage. The Portland cement bricks used to construct it were provided by a partnership between Rapid City Brick and Tile Company and Garland Construction. The main entrance is elevated above street level and accessed by two staircases. Two brick columns on the west face divide that side into three bays, which were originally used as docking areas and now separate the businesses that occupy the building. Above each bay is a green lintel decorated with rosette-shaped tie coverings. Windows are simple rectangular openings. Original plans left space for a second story to be added, but this was never carried out. Brickwork is also present inside, in the form of brick cornices along the western wall and crowning a central elevator shaft. This Otis Elevator was used to move produce between the lower cold storage and upper loading floors. When in use, the basement was filled with ice and insulated by sawdust. Upon its otherwise flat roof sits a cupola that houses the elevator mechanism. A lean-to was added to the eastern side of the building in the mid-19th century but had been removed by 1986.

References

National Register of Historic Places in Pennington County, South Dakota
Commercial buildings completed in 1920
Buildings and structures in Rapid City, South Dakota
Commercial buildings on the National Register of Historic Places in South Dakota
Warehouses on the National Register of Historic Places
1920 establishments in South Dakota